In page layout, illustration and sculpture, white space is often referred to as negative space. It is the portion of a page left unmarked: margins, gutters, and space between columns, lines of type, graphics, figures, or objects drawn or depicted, and is not necessarily actually white if the background is of a different colour. The term arises from graphic design practice, where printing processes generally use white paper. White space may be an element of design rather than just space left blank.

When space is at a premium, such as in some types of magazine, newspaper, and yellow pages advertising, white space is restricted in order to get as much information onto the page as possible. A page full of text or graphics with very little white space may appear cluttered, and be difficult to read. Some designs compensate for restricted white space by use of leading and typeface. Extensive white space may be left intentionally, with the purpose of giving an appearance deemed classic, elegant, or rich.

See also
 Composition (visual arts)
 Ma
 Minimalism (visual arts)
 Type color

References

External links
16 Things about White Space
On White Space in Graphic Design

Artistic techniques